The 1967 UK & Ireland Greyhound Racing Year was the 41st year of greyhound racing in the United Kingdom and Ireland.

Roll of honour

Summary
The Bookmakers Afternoon Greyhound Service (BAGS) was formed to alleviate some of the ongoing problems of afternoon racing. The leading bookmaking firms funded BAGS who would pay the National Greyhound Racing Society (NGRS) a set fee for the off course rights. The NGRS would then distribute the money between all NGRC affiliated tracks. This system would continue until 1978. The first tracks selected to host the race meetings were Park Royal, Kings Heath, Stamford Bridge and Oxford.  

Government tote tax was reduced from 5% to 2.5%. The annual totalisator turnover was £66,216,938 but attendances dipped below 10 million for the first time since 1927. There were 6009 meetings.

Tracks
The expected sale of West Ham Stadium to the Greyhound Racing Association went ahead  followed by the GRA purchase of Charlton Stadium. The GRA property trust then sold both within six years as they were redeveloped for housing and a shopping centre respectively.

Three new tracks opened, Blackpool (Borough Park), Clacton and Braintree (Cressing Road).

News
Clapton Stadium installed a closed-circuit television race patrol camera that was able to replay the races to the public. Although very expensive the equipment was a hit and would set the scene for the future. Former track owner John Bilsland died in June leaving legacies to three universities and their electrical engineers departments. Geoff De Mulder took over the kennels from his father Joe De Mulder. Foot and mouth broke out towards the later part of the year causing major problems on the open race scene in England and Ireland.

Competitions
The Crazy Parachute - Supreme Witch litter began to come to prominence, Forward Flash had won the Juvenile in 1966 and his brother Spectre II won the BBC Sportsview Television Trophy in April, with a track record in the final. Tric Trac and Spectre II then famously finished first and second in the 1967 English Greyhound Derby. After the final Tric-Trac was put to stud. The litter continued their good form when Forward Flash won the Manchester Cup and appeared in the Scottish Greyhound Derby final, while Forward King became Stewards' Cup champion as well as making the St Leger final along with litter sister Gezira at Wembley. Spectre II also won the Midlands St Leger at Wolverhampton. 

Monalee Champion trained by Frank Conlon broke Fearless Mac's White City track record when winning the Longcross Cup, winning his semi-final by 16 lengths and defeating Tric-Trac in the final. After running up in the Gold Collar final his preparations for the English Derby were hit when Conlon lost his licence and the dog was transferred to Vicky Holloway. Carry on Oregon, a brindle dog, came to prominence by lifting the Scurry Gold Cup in July and within a month the Laurels at Wimbledon Stadium was won. Carry on Oregon would be voted as Greyhound of the year.

Ireland
For the second successive year a greyhound won the double of the Easter Cup and Callanan Cup. The greyhound this time was Tinys Tidy Town who emulated Clomoney Grand's 1966 achievement. Tinys Tidy Town then joined Gay McKenna for a tilt at the English Derby.

Principal UK races

+Track Record

Totalisator returns

The totalisator returns declared to the licensing authorities for the year 1967 are listed below.

References 

Greyhound racing in the United Kingdom
Greyhound racing in the Republic of Ireland
UK and Ireland Greyhound Racing Year
UK and Ireland Greyhound Racing Year
UK and Ireland Greyhound Racing Year
UK and Ireland Greyhound Racing Year